Heath B. Jones is a United States Coast Guard serviceman who serves as the 14th Master Chief Petty Officer of the Coast Guard since 19 May 2022. He serves as the principal advisor to the Commandant of the Coast Guard on all enlisted personnel matters. As a matter of protocol, this gives him precedence equal to that of a three-star officer (vice admiral).

Education
Jones is a graduate of Class 124 of the Coast Guard Chief Petty Officers Academy, the Coast Guard Senior Enlisted Leadership Course class 48, and the National Defense University's Senior Enlisted Professional Military Education course. He holds both a Bachelor and a Master of Arts Degree in Organizational Management with a specialty in Human Resource Management. He also holds a Certificate of Apprenticeship as a Master Homeland Security Specialist from the United Services Military Apprenticeship Program.

Assignments
Since enlisting in the Coast Guard in May 1995, CMC Jones has served in a number of positions, including:

Command Master Chief, Deputy Commandant for Mission Support (DCMS), Washington, D.C.
Command Master Chief of Coast Guard Pacific Area
Command Master Chief for the 8th Coast Guard District
Command Master Chief of Coast Guard Sector Hampton Roads, Portsmouth, Virginia
First Lieutenant of Station New Orleans and Coast Guard Cutter 
Executive Petty Officer of Station Little Creek and Coast Guard Cutter 
Coast Guard Station Cape Charles, Virginia
Coast Guard Cutter 
Coast Guard Station Pensacola, Florida
Officer in Charge of Coast Guard Cutter

Family
Jones has been married to the former Carol Ann Clarke of Folsom, Louisiana since 1996. They are the parents of son Christian, attending graduate school at the University of New Orleans, and daughter Sidney, attending Louisiana State University Medical School in New Orleans.

Awards and decorations

6 gold service stripes.
Jones is also the recipient of the 2012 Signalman First Class Douglas Munro Inspirational Leadership Award and the 2006 Master Chief Petty Officer Angela McShan Inspirational Leadership Award.

References

Year of birth missing (living people)
Living people
Master Chief Petty Officers of the Coast Guard
Recipients of the Meritorious Service Medal (United States)